Guioa acuminata is a species of plant in the family Sapindaceae. It is endemic to the Philippines.

References

acuminata
Endemic flora of the Philippines
Trees of the Philippines
Endangered flora of Asia
Taxonomy articles created by Polbot